Ishkq in Paris is a 2013 Indian Hindi-language romance film starring Preity Zinta, Rhehan Malliek and Isabelle Adjani, directed by Prem Raj, produced by Zinta and co-written by Raj and Zinta. Initially set for release on 21 September 2012, the film was postponed multiple times before finally being released on 24 May 2013 in India, the United Kingdom and the United States. Koimoi stated the film failed to attract an initial audience, did not get any word of mouth publicity and was unable to compete for audience against the Indian Premier League cricket finals held its opening weekend.

Plot 
The story starts with a narration of Paris and its symbolization of love. Marie Elise is Narrator who says you can be in love but never find love/lover here in Paris. A Parisian reads a script of a play as follows. Ishkq is the name of girl who is born in Paris (Preity Zinta) who doesn't believe in deep love but all she wants is no commitments in relationship and wants to be free and is a Photographer and play writer.
Akash Kapoor, Cash with an A (Rhehan Malliek) and his friend Karan who comes to see him off are seen running on the railway station because they might miss last train to Paris when narrator says that Akash doesn't know that he will regret if he doesn't leave this train. Who knows if he leaves what will he miss in his life and Akash gets a work call while they wait for bidding goodbye. Karan says please come to my marriage, Akash says my kiss and love to Amelia(friends fiancé), Karan again says please do come for his marriage but Akash is not sure. Akash enters the train and scrolls his mobile and sees a girl keeping her luggage on top and says in Hindi. The girl is Ishkq and turns around to reply to Akash. They flirt around and have wine in the train to Paris, Ishkq says that she was roaming in Rome for weekend because she loves being served by men and Italian waiters to be specific and guesses if Akash is Gujarati. Akash introduces and says he is from Delhi, Funjabi (Punjabi) and moved to London a year ago, he missed his flight to London so catching this train to Paris and next day morning to London.

While leaving Akash asks for spending time with him but Ishkq denies, but she later agrees since he is also not interested in commitment and will never meet again or ask address, number or email id. Akash gives her a rose and Ishkq asks him to meet at 7:55pm sharp at Eiffel tower entrance.  Ishkq surprises Akash by showing him the Eiffel tower fills with lights and she narrates how she met an Italian waiter and fell in love at first sight in Rome, but he is weak and started crying. She used to go every morning his cafe for breakfast. When they roam around they see couple kissing but he never kisses her, she hints that after hot kisses cold gelato is good. He gets her gelato but charges her 4 euros. Akash teases her that even her love will be charged by this Italian waiter and her love for being served by men. Seems that he is an agent working at London and lives on commission like the hero of movie Jery Mcquire played by Tom Cruise.
Akash falls in love with her eyes and says anyone will forget if they see her eyes filled with love but again teases her last bf – Italian waiter. It was love in air or Paris's magic, both wanted the night to be beautiful.   Chunky Pandey stops them running around, says he has everything like antiques in the world and gives him a fun dice and they go to disc have drinks and dance.

At midnight, they walk on streets and Ishkq says about her school time boyfriend and say pickup lines to each other. They also share evil break up lines and go for dinner where a dance girl approached Akash and asks them to visit next day. But she seems to read their mind and tells Ishkq will get married in few months but Ishkq never believes and leaves the restaurant but the physic lady says she will find her father soon.  They throw dice and movie comes up and it's too late but they plan to make their own and enact few scenes. They go to park and Akash confesses that he never fell in love or shed a tear for anyone. Ishkq reveals that he had a snake charmer type boyfriend and she cried over him, because he said that she will never be happy and will be sad and lonely.
Akash cried only when his parent divorced but his parents were happy that his tears were never seen. Ishkq says she fears loneliness and she will be left alone and not able to make others happy. Akash says the world is scared about this. Their loneliness spoke volumes and made them friends.
It was next morning, they had coffee and Ishkq said she didn't like goodbye so asks Akash to leave first but asks him to wait for another surprise. They both agree they had the best night ever. Akash waits till he gets late and leaves. Next moment Ishkq arrives in the café with a gift but since he left she also leaves thinking they will never meet. There was an unconnected and unknown bonding between the two which both didn't realize. But could they forget one evening in Paris?

The foreigner has read the first part of the play and leaves the dressing room but thinks the story's staring would be a part of someone's life. The foreigner is none other than Ishkq mother, Ishkq Marie Elise.
Assistant says Deborah is here and her mother says she is not yet finished with the script. Both their lives are back to normal and they forget that beautiful night, time didn't stop. Akash used to smile thinking about it sometimes.
Akash gets a late-night message for Karan's wedding at Paris and says to Susan that Karan is irritating since Akash doesn't wants to come for Karan's wedding as he doesn't believe in marriage, Susan explains then Akash should not expect Karan to speak for rest of life. Akash searches for Ishkq and goes in Paris.
There they go together to Karan wedding and Akash realized his love for Ishkq and takes her all around and she confesses that the beautiful portrait of her mom is drawn by her dad the amazing artists according to Akash. He proposes her but she refuses him saying he is not her saviour from loneliness and insecurity. They part ways never to meet each other.
Ishkq’ s mom realizes her feelings and calls Akash to her home where Akash tells that her daughter is afraid of any serious relationship because of the split between her parents and feels insecure. Soon her mother realized and tells her that her parents Ranveer and Marie decided to part happily because of their careers and all these years Ishkq misunderstood that her dad left her.
Akash leaves her a card with apologies and that he will leave for London on next morning 8am train and will taste the laksa from the station restaurants. Ishkq is seen running towards him and confessing her love to him and that if he leaves she will be alone again.
He proposes to her again and hug and cry. Finally, the play which Marie Elise was directing which was Ishkq and Akash's love story gets over.  They fly to India for their Funjabi wedding and there Ishkq meets her father Ranveer recollecting her childhood days as well.

Cast 
Preity Zinta as Ishkq Marie Elise
Rhehan Malliek as Akash
Isabelle Adjani as Marie Elise
Mala Sinha 
Shekhar Kapur as Ranveer
Chunky Pandey 
Olivier Lafont as Karan
Salman Khan (Cameo)

Production 
The film marks a comeback for Preity Zinta.

Filming 
The film was shot mainly in Europe, at very great expense. Much of the film was shot in France (mainly in Paris and Lyon), with some scenes shot in Prague. A few scenes were shot in India also.

Soundtrack 

Music director duo Sajid–Wajid composed the songs for Ishkq in Paris. The soundtrack release date was announced on 15 September via Zinta's Twitter account. The songs are penned by Jalees Sherwani, Prasoon Joshi, Kumaar, Kausar Munir, Sophie Choudry and Priya Panchal.

Reception

Box office performance 
The film, collecting 4.2 million Rupees with an occupancy of "just 5 to 10 percent in multiplexes across the country". Comparatively, the new release that took the top place, Fast & Furious 6, collected 60 million Rupees on its first day. Despite being its opening weekend's second highest-grossing Hindi film, and third highest-grossing overall according to the International Business Times, the film "opened on such a bad note that it would require some miracle to come out with a decent number during the weekend", and in fact Ishkq in Paris only managed to collect a little over 10 million Rupees over the three-day period, and has been labeled a disaster.

Internationally, the film was released simultaneously on 15 screens in the United Kingdom and 8 screens in the United States where it also received a tepid response, garnering merely £11,057 and $6,732 respectively during the opening weekend, far less than the lower-profile Punjabi-language film Jatts in Golmaal, which opened on the same day. All-in-all, in its first week, Ishkq in Paris barely crossed the 20 million Rupee mark worldwide.

Critical response 
Writing for Sify, Sonia Chopra gave the film an extremely positive review, praising the entirety of the cast, the cinematography and the dialogues and labelling it "great" and "irresistible, despite its flaws".

Rachit Gupta of Filmfare gave the film 3/5 stars but did not have many positive things to say, calling the film a "flaky and uninteresting love story". Divya Solgama gave the film 2.25/5 stars on MoviezAdda, calling the film decent "overall", praising Preity Zinta's performance and criticizing the weak, dull screenplay. Similarly, in The Times of India, Meena Iyer gave 2.5/5 stars, stating "the actress is good but there ends the show", while Gaurav Malani called the film not "bad", but "boring", which to him was worse. In Bollywood Hungama, Taran Adarsh gave it the same rating, praising the chemistry between the two leads as well as the visuals, but criticizing the screenplay, concluding that Ishkq in Paris was "decent fare". Writing for India Today, Vinayak Chakravorty found that despite similarities with other films, it managed to find some originality and that Isabelle Adjani's performance was impressive, but was disappointed by the direction, the lack of chemistry between the leads, Rhehan Malliek's lack of screen presence, the fact that Preity Zinta's performance is similar to many other roles she's done before and deemed the script "bad". while similarly in Mint, Nandini Ramnath concluded that "if the movie works at all", it was because of the short runtime and Preity Zinta's "contagious joy at being the cynosure of attention". In The Asian Age, Suparna Sharma commended Zinta for producing the film herself and appreciated the short runtime but also found the story to be "wispy thin", Malliek to have "no personality" and Adjani to be "wasted".

Raja Sen for Rediff.com has given 1/5 stars and says Ishkq in Paris is a bad film brought further down by a bunch of Bollywood cliches and a fading Preity Zinta, which is the same rating given by Mayank Shekhar in the Daily Bhaskar, who goes on to call the lead characters "uninteresting" and lament the state of Preity Zinta's career. Strangely enough, Shekhar incorrectly claims that Zinta plays two roles in the film, that of Ishkq and Ishkq's mother. in.com gave the film a poor review too, criticizing the weak screenplay and Preity's performance. In a special "Twitter review" for IBN, Shomini Sen deemed that though "Preity Zinta tries hard [...], except for some amazing shots of Paris [the film] has nothing much to offer.", while in another, more traditional review, Rajeev Masand called the film "misguided" and "overwrought", in addition to finding Rhehan Malliek "as expressive as a slab of granite". In Koimoi, Mohar Basu gave the film 2/5 stars, praising the editing but criticizing the screenplay and the lack of chemistry between the leads. while India TV News felt that Preity Zinta's screen presence is the only reason to watch the film despite the "decent" cinematography and "crisp" editing, as Rhehan Malliek is "unconvincing" and the music "unmemorable". Teena Elizabeth Chacko, writing in Book My Show, found the cinematography "excellent" as well as the narration by Isabelle Adjani, deemed the performances by Zinta and Malliek to be decent and the music average, but found fault with the multitude of clichés, the cheesy dialogues and the numerous illogical moments, giving the film 1.5/5 stars and stating that one could "definitely afford to miss it", while in The Indian Express, Shubhra Gupta gave it 2/5 stars, lamenting that it was filled with "all the clichés that you can think of". Glam Sham'''s Enkayaar criticized the screenplay, as did Shubha Shetty-Saha in Mid-Day, who went on to call Adjani "wasted", Malliek "flat" and felt that Preity Zinta looked desperate to recapture her lost success, deeming the film "disappointing". In the Hindustan Times, Sarit Ray thought the film felt dated though he did enjoy the cinematography and in The Hindu, Sudhish Kamath gave the film one of its worst reviews, calling the writing "weak" and the actors "awful", warning potential viewers that going to see the film might leave them "feeling suicidal". For the Mumbai Mirror, Karan Anshuman thought the movie was "without heart", the actors had no chemistry and felt sorry for the state of Preity Zinta's career, encouraging her to "be bold" and "change the act", similarly in Daily News and Analysis, Tushar Joshi felt that the actress seemed "in a constant need for approval", advising only her die-hard fans to go watch the film. The Deccan Herald, Shilpa Jamkhandikar called the film "mediocre", a "farce of a film" and Preity Zinta "a shadow of her past [self]", while Khalid Mohamed wrote in the Deccan Chronicle that the screenplay was "thinner than crepe". For First Post, Deepanjana Pal deemed the film completely illogical, in Business of Cinema, Udita Jhunjhunwala claimed that despite its short runtime "Ishkq in Paris feels like a nine-hour flight, with jet lag" and Box Office India thought the cinematography was "outstanding", Zinta's performance was "noteworthy" and the background music "superb", but concluded that director Prem Raj "impresses a little but disappoints a lot", predicting a flop. For The New Indian Express, Nandini Krishnan called Preity Zinta "irritating" and the film "an insult to cinema, Paris, love and Isabelle Adjani" and in the Pakistani The Friday Times, Nandini Krishnan was "appalled" by the film, calling it "disastrous" and making fun of "the almost 40-year-old Zinta [...] trying to pass off as the still-beautiful Adjani's daughter", saying it "gave [her her] first laugh of the film". Similarly in Outlook'', Namrata Joshi was saddened by Zinta's plastic surgery-altered looks, thought she lacked chemistry with her co-star and called the narration tedious.

References

External links 
 
 

2013 films
2010s Hindi-language films
2010s French-language films
Films shot in the Czech Republic
Films shot in France
Films shot in Paris
Films set in Paris
Films set in France